Santa Margherita Ligure is a comune (municipality) in the Metropolitan City of Genoa in the Italian region Liguria, located about  southeast of Genoa, in the area traditionally known as Tigullio. It has a port, used for both tourism and fishing activities. Part of comune  territory is included in the Regional Natural Park of Portofino. Santa Margherita Ligure borders the following municipalities: Camogli, Portofino, Rapallo.

History
The presence of a Roman settlement has not been definitely proven. The burgh, known as Pescino, was devastated by Rothari in 641 and by the Saracens in the 10th century. Later it was a fief of the Fieschi family until 1229, when it was acquired by the Republic of Genoa.

In 1432 it was attacked by the fleet of Venice and in 1549, together with Rapallo, by that of Turgut.

In 1813, under the Napoleonic domination, the two burghs of Pescino and Corte were unified as Porto Napoleone. Two years later it was annexed to the Kingdom of Sardinia as the commune of Santa Margherita Ligure. In 1861 it became part of the newly unified Kingdom of Italy.

Connected by rail in the 20th century, Santa Margherita became a renowned tourist resort after World War II.

Main sights
Castello di Santa Margherita Ligure, built by the Republic of Genoa in 1550 as defence against the increasing attacks of North African pirates. It was designed by the same architect of the Castle of Rapallo. After World War I it was restored and entitled to the Italian victims of that conflict.
Basilica of St. Margaret of Antiochia, built from 1658 on the remains of a 13th-century church.
Abbazia della Cervara, a historically relevant abbey on the road to Portofino.
Villa Durazzo complex, including two patrician villas, a 16th-century castle and 17th-century park.

Outlying districts (frazione) 
 Paraggi was a small village of fishermen and millers. It is located along the "Costa dei Delfini", halfway between Santa Margherita and Portofino.
 Nozarego is a natural terrace over the Bay of Tigullio. Here there is the church of Santa Maria Assunta with the cobbled square in typical ligurian. From Nozarego also leave several trails in the Park of Portofino.
 San Lorenzo della Costa is located on the slopes of the mountain, to the north, along the Aurelia road that leads to Genoa. There is a Flemish triptych in the local 13th-century church.

References

External links

 Official website
  Santa Margherita Ligure website
 Santa Margherita Ligure - collection of images and videos
 

Cities and towns in Liguria